Phoomyia is a genus of flies in the family Dolichopodidae. The genus is found in Sri Lanka and Thailand, and is closely related to Argyrochlamys and Pseudargyrochlamys. The generic name is a combination of Phoo, the Thai word for crab, and myia, the Greek word for fly.

Species
 Phoomyia srilankensis Naglis & Grootaert, 2013
 Phoomyia thailandensis Naglis & Grootaert, 2013

References

Dolichopodinae
Dolichopodidae genera
Diptera of Asia